Atroxima afzeliana is a species of plant in the milkwort family (Polygalaceae). It is endemic to rainforests and forest fringes with altitudes below  in Western Tropical Africa. It was first described in 1868 by Daniel Oliver, at which point it was described as  a new Carpolobia or a new genera. In 1905, Otto Stapf classified it into the atroxima genera.

Description
It has sweeping branches and is sometimes scandent. Its leaves are leathery and elliptical. It produces 6 to 10 flowers which are mauve or cream-coloured.

Uses
Apart from the fruit being edible, the stem, root, and leaves of the plant are used as medicine to treat various illnesses.

References

Polygalaceae